Cydnus is a genus of burrowing bugs in the tribe Cydnini. There are at least three described species in Cydnus.

Species
These three species belong to the genus Cydnus:
 Cydnus aterrimus (Forster, 1771) i c g b
 Cydnus insularis Westwood, 1837 g
 Cydnus latipes Westwood, 1837 g
Data sources: i = ITIS, c = Catalogue of Life, g = GBIF, b = Bugguide.net

References

Further reading

External links

 

Cydnidae
Articles created by Qbugbot